Ballingarry may refer to:

Places 
Ballingarry, County Limerick, a village in County Limerick, Ireland
Ballingarry, North Tipperary, a townland and civil parish in the north of County Tipperary, Ireland
Ballingarry, South Tipperary, a village in the south of County Tipperary, Ireland
Ballingarry Coal Mines in Ballingarry, South Tipperary
Ballymagarry, a townland in Belfast, formerly named Ballingarry

Other uses
Ballingarry (horse), Irish-bred Thoroughbred racehorse
Ballingarry GAA, a gaelic sports club in south Tipperary, Ireland 
Ballingarry A.F.C., a soccer club in County Limerick, Ireland